The list of shipwrecks in 1912 includes ships sunk, foundered, grounded, or otherwise lost during 1912.

January

1 January

4 January

5 January

6 January

7 January

8 January

9 January

10 January

11 January

13 January

16 January

18 January

19 January

20 January

21 January

23 January

26 January

27 January

29 January

31 January

February

2 February

3 February

4 February

12 February

15 February

16 February

17 February

18 February

19 February

21 February

22 February

23 February

24 February

26 February

27 February

28 February

29 February

Unknown date

March

1 March

2 March

3 March

5 March

6 March

8 March

9 March

11 March

12 March

13 March

15 March

16 March

20 March

21 March

22 March

23 March

24 March

25 March

27 March

28 March

April

2 April

3 April

4 April

5 April

6 April

7 April

8 April

12 April

15 April

18 April

20 April

21 April

25 April

27 April

28 April

29 April

30 April

Unknown date

May

5 May

8 May

10 May

12 May

13 May

14 May

15 May

20 May

21 May

24 May

29 May

Unknown date

June

2 June

4 June

8 June

9 June

12 June

13 June

14 June

17 June

20 June

21 June

24 June

25 June

26 June

27 June

28 June

29 June

July

11 July

13 July

17 July

18 July

21 July

24 July

Unknown date

August

7 August

8 August

12 August

17 August

19 August

21 August

23 August

26 August

29 August

31 August

Unknown date

September

1 September

3 September

5 September

10 September

13 September

14 September

21 September

26 September

28 September

October

4 October

5 October

7 October

12 October

13 October

16 October

19 October

20 October

23 October

24 October

29 October

31 October

Unknown date

November

1 November

6 November

7 November

8 November

10 November

12 November

13 November

15 November

21 November

23 November

24 November

25 November

28 November

Unknown date

December

3 December

6 December

7 December

8 December

15 December

20 December

21 December

23 December

24 December

26 December

30 December

Unknown date

Unknown date

References

1912
 
Ships